Soñador is the debut solo album by Mexican pop singer Mijares. The album has two official names, Manuel Mijares and Soñador (Dreamer), and was edited in 1986.

History
Originally, this work was issued as a self-titled album, but it was reduced to his artistic name Mijares.  This was a big beginning for the singer, and it was under the production of Miguel Blasco, who already several hits with singers like Daniela Romo, Yuri, Pandora, among others.  They hit the target with his first international triumph track "Bella" (Beautiful woman).  He collaborated with songwriters like José Ramón Florez, Hernaldo Zúñiga, Gian Pietro Felisatti, and Marco Flores.  In the LP album, it shows the track "Poco a poco" (Little by little), but it was excluded from the CD version for "Soñador", and the title of the album was changed to the name of that song. "Soñador" was the song that Mijares performed to participate in OTI Festival, reaching third place.

Track listing

Lp Album
Tracks :
 Siempre - 3:32
 Bella - 3:44
 Nunca sabras amar - 3:20
 Poco a poco - 3:32
 A corazón abierto - 3:38
 Amor has de esperar - 3:14
 Volveré a nacer - 3:44
 Al caminar - 3:07
 Culpable - 3:31
 Vete por favor amor - 3:33

Soñador (LP 2nd Edicion/CD Version)
 Siempre
 Bella
 Nunca sabras amar
 Soñador
 A corazón abierto
 Amor has de esperar
 Volveré a nacer
 Al caminar
 Culpable
 Vete por favor amor

Singles
 Bella (Beautiful woman)
 Soñador (Dreamer)
 Siempre (Always)
 Al Caminar (When walking)

1986 debut albums
Manuel Mijares albums